Samantha Evans is an Australian Pentecostal Christian worship leader and singer-songwriter who primarily writes praise and worship songs. She is the founder and Senior pastor at Planetshakers Church, alongside her husband Russell Evans.

History
In 1997, Samantha Evans began the journey which is now known as Planetshakers Church with her husband Russell. She has served her local church as co-lead pastor in Melbourne where the first Planetshakers Church was started in 2004 and has grown to more than 12,000 members.

Ministry
Evans is co-founder, worship leader of the Planetshakers band that was formed in 1997. The band, through the church, has a record label, Planetshakers Ministries International.

Family and personal life
Samantha Evans grew up in a Catholic family. At age 16, she suffered family abandonment by her father. After finishing her senior year of high school an aunt began to talk to her about a personal relationship with Jesus and she converted to evangelical Christianity. She began to attend a small Assemblies of God church weekly. She met her husband Russell at the church. Samantha Evans married Russell Evans in 1992 and together they have two children Jonathan and Aimee.

Discography

References

Singers from Melbourne
Planetshakers members
Australian women singer-songwriters
Australian gospel singers
Christian music songwriters
Performers of contemporary worship music
Australian Charismatics
Living people
Year of birth missing (living people)